The University of North Carolina Wilmington (UNCW or UNC Wilmington) is a public research university in Wilmington, North Carolina. It is part of the University of North Carolina System and enrolls 17,499 undergraduate and graduate students each year. It is classified among "R2: Doctoral Universities – High research activity".

Founded on September 4, 1947, Wilmington College opened as a junior college, primarily providing education to World War II veterans. The school became a four-year liberal arts college in 1963, following legislation from the North Carolina General Assembly. In 1969, the college became a university and was renamed as the University of North Carolina Wilmington. Today, it has three campuses with the main campus in Wilmington, an extension campus in Jacksonville, North Carolina, and the Center for Marine Science near Myrtle Grove.

History
UNCW opened its doors on September 4, 1947, as Wilmington College. At the time, it operated as a junior college offering freshman-level courses to 238 students during the first school year, 77% of whom were veterans returning from military service following World War II. Under the control of the New Hanover County Board of Education, Wilmington College earned accreditation from the North Carolina College Conference in 1948 and became a member of the American Association of Junior Colleges. Further accreditation came in 1952 from the Southern Association of Colleges and Schools.

In 1958, Wilmington College was placed under the Community College Act of North Carolina, passing control from the New Hanover County Board of Education to a board of trustees as a state-supported college under the supervision of the North Carolina Board of Higher Education.

Wilmington College became a four-year liberal arts college on July 1, 1963, when the North Carolina General Assembly passed legislation allowing it to award bachelor's degrees. Six years later, July 1, 1969, the college was elevated to university status under its present name, becoming the fifth campus of the University of North Carolina system. On August 22, 1977, UNCW was authorized to offer its first graduate programs at the master's level.
The university offers 55 bachelor's degrees, 35 master's degrees and four doctoral degrees: Ed.D. Educational Leadership; Ph.D. Integrative, Comparative and Marine Biology; Ph.D. Psychology and a  Doctorate in Nursing Practice.

Academics

The university is organized into seven colleges:
College of Arts and Sciences
Cameron School of Business
College of Health and Human Services
Watson College of Education
Graduate School
Honors College
University College

The university has 55 undergraduate degree programs, 35 master's degree programs and four doctoral programs.

Rankings

Randall Library
William Madison Randall Library supports the mission of UNCW through the provision of information resources, services and programs relevant to the needs of its students, faculty and staff. To accomplish this mission, the library provides diverse collections of informational resources in multiple formats, including assistance and instruction in identifying, evaluating and interpreting these resources.

Randall Library has two floors. The first floor features computer banks, group work areas, the Technology Assistance Center, and a coffee shop for students. The floor has a very social atmosphere, and is commonly used to complete group assignments. The second floor has a strictly enforced quiet policy.

Most recently added to the library are charging kiosks. The kiosk located near TAC in the back of the library "provides six secure lockers to store your [iPhone, Android, iPad or other tablets] while it charges."

Centers, institutes, and extensions
Center for Support of Undergraduate Research and Fellowships
Center for Teaching Excellence
Center for Marine Science
Center for Innovation and Entrepreneurship
ETEAL
Osher Lifelong Learning Institute
Swain Center for Professional and Continuing Education

Student life

Campus life
The university offers degrees in humanities, sciences, health, business and professional fields. The university's highly ranked marine science program draws a variety of undergraduate and graduate students from across the United States. The proximity to the Atlantic Ocean is a draw for incoming freshmen.

Teal is the official school color of UNCW, with navy and gold as alternate colors.

The average high school GPA was 4.13 for incoming freshmen in 2018, and the SAT average score was 1251.

Student facilities

In 2000, the Student Recreation Center was opened to students, staff, and faculty members. It houses three basketball courts, exercise machines, a weight training area, an indoor running track, and an indoor climbing wall. It also includes a group exercise room which supports multiple clubs and activities, including Yoga, Pilates, and an Aikido club. In 2012, the Student Recreation Center completed an expansion of facilities, as well as construction on a new natatorium. This construction doubled the size of the existing Recreation Center.

Lumina Theater, named after the boardwalk theater that was once found on Wrightsville Beach, features 333 stadium seats, a 15.5' x 30' screen, Dolby Digital surround sound,  and a digital projection system. Lumina screens blockbusters, independents, cult classics, art films, international films and student films throughout the academic year, several days a week, except during University holidays and breaks. Some notable Lumina events included a multi-part, high-definition screening of BBC's Planet Earth series over the span of several weekends, and a yearly 24-hour movie marathon called Hawk-In.

Housing
On campus, the Department of Housing and Residence Life manages eleven residence halls and on-campus apartment complexes. The buildings are managed within geographically similar "areas", which are led by a Residence Coordinator (RC) and Assistance Residence Coordinator (ARC). The UNCW Residence Hall Association (RHA) is the overall governing body for the residence halls and is composed of councils from each of the residential areas.

A residential quad on the south-central side of campus, comprising Galloway Hall, Graham-Hewlett Hall, Sandpiper Hall, Pelican Hall, and Belk Hall is in the process of being constructed. Two more buildings, Terrapin Hall and Loggerhead Hall, located on the eastern side of the quad are currently under construction, and will be complete in the Fall of 2021. Galloway Hall is UNCW's first residence facility on campus, and has a standard hall-style double room arrangement with shared bathrooms for the entire hall. Housing 400 students, predominantly Freshman, Galloway has a very social atmosphere. It was the first dorm in the UNC system to be built with air condition and was originally called "Dorm '71". Graham-Hewlett Hall and Belk Hall residence halls are configured in suite-style hall arrangements with up to eight individuals sharing a bathroom. Graham-Hewlett houses 384 residents and Belk houses 192 residents, and both facilities consist of predominantly first-year students. Originally a co-ed facility, Belk Hall was all female for quite some years before returning co-ed beginning in the 2016-2017 academic year. Pelican Hall and Sandpiper Hall were completed in 2020 as a part of the larger housing quad project. The buildings are built to mirror each other, each containing a pod-style layout and 518 bed spaces.

Schwartz Hall houses 160 residents, and is home to mostly first-year students. A double room layout features shared bathrooms but is distinguished by its "pod" layout in contrast with the typical hall style areas. Adjacent to Schwartz Hall are the University Suites, which consists of seven pod-style buildings housing 400 students. Additionally, various sororities have personalized suites within the University Suites.

Keystone Hall, Cornerstone Hall, and Innovation House form a residential area known as "Tri-House". All three residence halls were constructed in the late 1990s and early 2000s. Cornerstone Hall houses freshman Honors College students. Various other living-learning learning communities are housed within the Tri-House area. Combined the area can house 465 students, with 265 students in Cornerstone Hall, and 100 in Keystone and Innovation House respectively. All three buildings are in a traditional format.

Three on-campus apartment complexes are located at UNCW, Seahawk Village, Seahawk Crossing, and Seahawk Landing. All apartments are fully furnished, including a full-service kitchen, and washer and dryer. Upperclassmen are the only members allowed to live in the on-campus apartments at UNCW. Seahawk Village contained two, three, and four bedroom apartments which houses 524 students within six apartment buildings. Additionally, Seahawk Village contains a pool and clubhouse, only accessible to residents. Seahawk Landing contains similar two, three, and four bedroom apartments, with a combined 662 students living in seven buildings. Seahawk Landing contains a pool, only accessible to residents, with a sandwich shop and convenience market open to the public. Seahawk Crossing contains a slightly different layout, containing four, six, and eight person apartments with a combined 662 students within four apartment buildings.

Dining
On-campus dining at UNCW is managed by the Campus Dining department within Auxiliary Services in coordination with Aramark. Various dining locations are found throughout campus, mostly clustered in various areas. Wagoner Hall, located on the eastern side of campus and has a traditional cafeteria style of dining. Dub's Cafe, located inside of Warwick Hall, offers a similar cafeteria layout with a focus on sustainability.

Port City Java has two locations on campus, one located in Randall Library and another inside of Sandpiper Hall. Starbucks operates a franchised location inside of "The Hub" dining area located adjacent to Graham-Hewlett Hall. Mooyah operates within the same dining area, adjacent to Starbucks.

The Fisher University Union houses Hawk's Nest, a dining center where students can choose from a wide assortment of available options. Hawk's Nest offers Mexican food, Mediterranean food, flatbread pizza, Greek cuisine, hamburgers and fries. A Chick-fil-A Express, Panda Express and Subway are located within Fisher University Union. Einstein Bros. Bagels is located across the courtyard in Fisher Student Union. Additionally, the Landing Sandwich shop is located within the Seahawk Landing residential area.

Several convenience stores exist throughout campus, labeled as P.O.D. Markets (Provisions on Demand) and are operated by Aramark.

Greek life

Greek-letter societies became an early part of student life at UNCW when the first social fraternity was formed in January 1964, just six months after Wilmington College became a four-year institution. Fraternities and Sororities have continued to grow at UNCW with membership now around 9.8% percent of the overall student population, falling slightly below the national average. There are 15 social fraternities and 11 social sororities. The National Pan-Hellenic Council has 6 historically black organizations, three fraternities and three sororities. UNCW also has one Christian sorority. Several fraternities and sororities have on-campus housing in University Suites and University Apartments. More recently, Alpha Psi Lambda, a coeducational Latino-based fraternity, has established a colony at UNCW.

Fraternities
There are currently 17 national fraternities at UNCW:

Alpha Sigma Phi
Alpha Psi Lambda
Alpha Tau Omega
Chi Phi
Delta Chi
Delta Kappa Epsilon
Delta Sigma Phi
Kappa Alpha Order
Kappa Sigma
Lambda Chi Alpha
Phi Gamma Delta
Pi Kappa Alpha
Pi Kappa Phi
Sigma Alpha Epsilon
Sigma Chi
Tau Kappa Epsilon
Theta Chi

Sororities
There are currently 11 national sororities at UNCW:

Alpha Chi Omega
Alpha Delta Pi
Alpha Gamma Delta
Alpha Phi
Alpha Xi Delta
Chi Omega
Delta Zeta
Delta Gamma
Kappa Delta
Phi Mu
Sigma Sigma Sigma

National Pan-Hellenic Council, Inc.
The 4 historically black fraternities include:
Alpha Phi Alpha
Kappa Alpha Psi
Omega Psi Phi
Phi Beta Sigma

The 3 historically black sororities include:
Alpha Kappa Alpha
Delta Sigma Theta
Zeta Phi Beta

Christian sorority
Sigma Alpha Omega

Honors fraternity
Phi Sigma Pi

Athletics

The UNCW athletic teams are known as the Seahawks. They are NCAA's Division I members fielding 18 teams, 8 varsity athletic teams for men (baseball, basketball, cross country, golf, soccer, swimming, tennis, track & field) and 10 for women (basketball, cross country, golf, soccer, softball, swimming, tennis, track & field, volleyball, beach volleyball). UNCW is a member of the Colonial Athletic Association. The men's and women's basketball teams play at Trask Coliseum and the baseball team plays at Brooks Field. The teams' colors include navy blue, teal, and gold. The baseball team has made eight appearances in the NCAA tournament (2003, 2004, 2006, 2008, 2012, 2013, 2015, 2016) while the men's basketball team postseason accolades include six NCAA tournament appearances (2000, 2002, 2003, 2006, 2016, 2017), two trips to the NIT (1998, 2001) and one invitation to the Collegeinsider.com tournament in 2015.

Notable people

Alumni

Faculty
Herbert Berg, Philosophy and Religion (previous faculty member)
Clyde Edgerton, Creative Writing
Philip Furia, Creative Writing (deceased)
David Gessner, Creative Writing
Peter Jurasik, Acting for the Camera
Tim Palmer, French and Japanese film studies.
Joseph R. Pawlik, Frank Hawkins Kenan Distinguished Professor of Marine Biology
Jarrod Tanny, Charles and Hannah Block Distinguished Scholar in Jewish History

References

External links

UNCW Athletics website

 
University of North Carolina
Educational institutions established in 1947
Public universities and colleges in North Carolina
Buildings and structures in Wilmington, North Carolina
Universities and colleges accredited by the Southern Association of Colleges and Schools
Education in New Hanover County, North Carolina
1947 establishments in North Carolina
Liberal arts colleges in North Carolina